Alex Amankwah (born 2 March 1992) is a Ghanaian middle-distance runner specialising in the 800 metres. He attended college and competed in athletics at the University of Alabama, where he set a school record and was a First Team All-American in the indoor 800 metres. He qualified for the 800 metres at the 2015 World Championships in Beijing, China but was unable to compete due to visa issues. He also represented Ghana in the 4 × 400 metres relay at the 2015 African Games.

Amankwah represented Ghana in the 800 metres at the 2016 Summer Olympics in Rio de Janeiro, Brazil.

Competition record

Personal bests
Outdoor
800 metres – 1:44.80 (Marietta GA, 19 May 2017)
400 metres – 46.34 (Tallahassee FL, 25 March 2016
Indoor
800 metres – 1:46.88 (Nashville TN, 24 January  2015)

References

External links 
 

1992 births
Living people
Ghanaian male middle-distance runners
Olympic athletes of Ghana
Athletes (track and field) at the 2015 African Games
Alabama Crimson Tide men's track and field athletes
Athletes (track and field) at the 2016 Summer Olympics
Athletes (track and field) at the 2018 Commonwealth Games
World Athletics Championships athletes for Ghana
Ghanaian expatriate sportspeople in the United States
Commonwealth Games competitors for Ghana
African Games competitors for Ghana